The 2021 BWF Continental Circuit was the fifteenth season of the BWF Continental Circuit of badminton, a circuit of 40 tournaments. The 40 tournaments are divided into three levels:
International Challenge (12 tournaments)
International Series (16 tournaments)
Future Series (11 tournaments).
Each of these tournaments offers different ranking points and prize money.

Points distribution 
Below is the point distribution table for each phase of the tournament based on the BWF points system for the BWF Continental Circuit events.

Results 
Below is the schedule released by Badminton World Federation:

Winners

International Challenge

International Series

Future Series

Statistics

Performance by countries 
Below are the 2021 BWF Continental Circuit performances by country. Only countries who have won a title are listed:

International Challenge

International Series

Future Series

Performance by categories 
To avoid confusion and double counting, information in this table shall only be updated once a tournament has concluded. These tables were calculated after Italian International.

Men's singles

Women's singles

Men's doubles

Women's doubles

Mixed doubles

References 

2021 in badminton
Badminton tours and series
BWF International Challenge
BWF International Series
BWF Future Series